Simon's Got a Gift is a 2019 French drama film directed by Léo Karmann.

Cast 
 Benjamin Voisin - Simon
 Martin Karmann - Thomas Durant
  - Madeleine Durant
  - Jacques Durant
 Julie-Anne Roth - Agnès Durant

References

External links 

2019 drama films
French drama films